Big Japan Pro Wrestling has held a variety of different professional wrestling tournaments, mainly in deathmatch format, competed for by sports entertainers that are a part of their roster.

Sporadic tournaments

BJW Junior Heavyweight Championship Tournament (1998)
The BJW Junior Heavyweight Championship Tournament was an eight-man single-elimination tournament conducted on March 2, 1998, to crown the inaugural BJW Junior Heavyweight Champion.

BJW Deathmatch Heavyweight Championship Tournament (1998)
The BJW Deathmatch Heavyweight Championship Tournament was held to crown the inaugural BJW Deathmatch Heavyweight Champion from June 8 to August 9, 1998.

BJW Junior Heavyweight Championship Tournament (1999)
The BJW Junior Heavyweight Championship Tournament was a round-robin tournament for the vacant BJW Junior Heavyweight Championship held between June 14 and June 30, 1999.

Grand Prix Tournament
The Grand Prix Tournament was a single elimination tournament which took place between January 2, 2000, and February 22, 2000.

Yamakawa's BJW Deathmatch Heavyweight Championship was on the line.

Super J-Cup Qualifying Tournament
The Super J-Cup Qualifying Tournament was a tournament for junior heavyweight wrestlers with the winner qualifying for the 2000 Super J-Cup, representing BJW in the tournament. The tournament was held between February 23 and March 3, 2000.

2000 World Extreme Cup
The 2000 World Extreme Cup was a round-robin tournament contested under deathmatch variations. The tournament consisted of three blocks with each block consisting of four wrestlers and a total of twelve participants in the tournament. The top three scorers of each block qualified for the knockout stage of the tournament.

BJW Heavyweight Championship Tournament
The BJW Heavyweight Championship Tournament was held between March 18 and March 20, 2001, to determine the inaugural BJW Heavyweight Champion.

BJW Deathmatch Heavyweight Championship Tournament (2001)
A tournament was held to crown a new BJW Deathmatch Heavyweight Champion after previous champion Tomoaki Honma left the company in March 2001, thus vacating the title. The tournament was held between April 28 and May 4, 2001.

Six-Man Maximum Tag League
The Six-Man Tag Team League was a round-robin tournament featuring four trios with each trio consisting of three wrestlers and the tournament featured six-man tag team matches. The tournament was held between October 15 and October 25, 2001. The tournament was won by the trio of KAMIKAZE, Hideki Hosaka and Shunme Matsuzaki.

2002 World Extreme Cup
The 2002 World Extreme Cup was the second version of the World Extreme Cup tournament consisting of four blocks and four wrestlers in each block, a total of sixteen participants in the tournament. The top two wrestlers from each block qualified for the knockout stage of the tournament.

Hayabusa Cup
The Hayabusa Cup was a round-robin tournament which took place between April 14 and May 6, 2002. The tournament was held as a homage to Frontier Martial-Arts Wrestling superstar Hayabusa, who had recently retired from wrestling due to a severe injury which left him paralysed for the rest of his life.

Six-Man Tag Team Tournament
A knockout tournament was held on June 13, 2004, featuring six-man tag team matches.

Number 1 of Japan Tournament
The Number 1 of Japan Tournament was held on September 5, 2004.

New Generation Battle Tournament
The New Generation Battle Tournament was a tournament held on January 9, 2005.

Dainichi Dash
The Dainichi Dash was a tournament held on July 1, 2009.

1 Day Tag Team Tournament
The 1 Day Tag Team Tournament was a three-team tournament held on August 5, 2013.

8-Man Tag Team Tournament
The 8-Man Tag Team Tournament was a deathmatch tournament featuring eight-man tag team matches on August 19, 2009.

D-Dash Tag Team Tournament
The D-Dash Tag Team Tournament was a tag team tournament held between November 3 and December 23, 2009.

BJW Tag Team Championship Tournament
A tournament was set up for the vacant BJW Tag Team Championship after previous champions Shinya Ishikawa and Yoshihito Sasaki vacated the titles due to Ishikawa suffering a leg injury. The tournament was held between March 19 and April 28, 2010.

Dainichi-X (2011)
The 2011 Dainichi-X was a round-robin tag team tournament which took place between February 2 and October 26, 2011.

Dainichi-X (2012)
The 2012 Dainichi-X was a round-robin tournament with the top two teams advancing to the final round.

Jun Ogawauchi was a replacement for the injured Ryuichi Kawakami. Ogawauchi and Shinya Ishikawa replaced to compete in the final round and thus were replaced by the third ranked tag team in the tournament in the final round.

Strong Style Rising Tournament
The Strong Style Rising Tournament was a tournament held between May 24 and June 5, 2013.

BJW Junior Heavyweight Championship Tournament (2017)
A round robin tournament was held for the newly created BJW Junior Heavyweight Championship, distinct from the previous version.

BJW Junior Heavyweight Championship #1 Contender's Tournament
A tournament was set up to determine the #1 contender for Shinobu's BJW Junior Heavyweight Championship, taking place between June 13 and July 17, 2018.

Hercules Senga changed his ring name to Banana Senga in the semi-final round.

6-Man Sacred Ground City of Forest Sendai Tournament
The 6-Man Sacred Ground City of Forest Sendai Tournament was a six-man tag team tournament, in which the Yokohama Shopping Street 6-Man Tag Team Championship was defended. The tournament was held on August 5, 2018. The defending champions Abdullah Kobayashi, Ryuji Ito and Jaki Numazawa lost the titles to Masaya Takahashi, Takayuki Ueki and Toshiyuki Sakuda, who would successfully defend the titles in the final round to win the tournament.

Saikyo Tag League

Saikyo Tag League is a professional wrestling round-robin hardcore tag team tournament annually held since 1999.

Dates and venues of finals

Ikkitousen Deathmatch Survivor

Ikkitousen Deathmatch Survivor is an annual professional wrestling round-robin hardcore tournament to determine the best wrestler of BJW's deathmatch division.

Dates and venues of finals

Ikkitousen Strong Climb

Ikkitousen Strong Climb is an annual professional wrestling round-robin hardcore tournament to determine the best wrestler of BJW's Strong BJ division.

Dates and venues of finals

References

External links
 Big Japan Pro Wrestling official website

Tournaments
Professional wrestling tournaments
Professional wrestling-related lists